The Pensacola metropolitan area is the metropolitan area centered on Pensacola, Florida. It is also known as the Pensacola-Ferry Pass-Brent Metropolitan Statistical Area, a metropolitan statistical area (MSA) used for statistical purposes by the United States Census Bureau and other agencies. The Pensacola Standard Metropolitan Statistical Area was first defined after the 1960 United States Census, with Pensacola as the principal city, and included Escambia and Santa Rosa counties. Ferry Pass and Brent, which are unincorporated census-designated places in Escambia County, were added as principal cities after the 2000 Census. The population of the MSA in the 2020 census was 511,502.

The five incorporated cities within the MSA are Pensacola (Population: 51,923), Milton (8,866), Gulf Breeze (6,466), Century (1,786), and Jay (590). In addition, several unincorporated census-designated places account for a great number of the population. Most notable is Navarre (41,940); its population makes it the second largest community in the metro area, only behind Pensacola.

Demographics

As of the census of 2020, there were 509,905 people residing within the MSA. The racial makeup of the MSA was 70.2% White, 15.7% African American, 0.7% Native American, 2.7% Asian, 0.2% Pacific Islander, 2.2% from other races, and 8.3% from two or more races. Hispanic or Latino of any race were 6.4% of the population.

Economy

Personal income
The median income for a household in the MSA was $38,558, and the median income for a family was $44,319. Males had a median income of $32,966 versus $22,164 for females. The per capita income for the MSA was $19,365.

Tourism
Tourism in the Pensacola Bay area brings in about $552 million annually. Palafox Place contains multiple venues for nightlife.

Beaches

Pensacola Beach
Navarre Beach
Perdido Key

Retail
Cordova Mall
University Town Plaza

Transportation

Commercial airports

Interstate Highways

 Interstate 10 in Florida
 Reuben O'Donovan Askew Parkway (Interstate 110)

U.S. Highways
 U.S. Highway 29
 U.S. Highway 90
U.S. Highway 90 Alternate
 U.S. Highway 98
U.S. 98 BUS

State Highways
 State Road 4
 State Road 87
 State Road 97
 State Road 196
  State Road 281
 State Road 289
 State Road 727
 State Road 290
 State Road 291
 State Road 292
 State Road 294
 State Road 295
 State Road 296
 State Road 297
 State Road 298
 State Road 399

Codes of metropolitan Pensacola

Area codes

850, 448

ZIP codes
The following is a list of ZIP codes for selected areas within the metropolitan area.

Escambia County
32501 in Pensacola, downtown north of Wright Street
32502 in Pensacola, downtown south of Wright Street
32503 in Pensacola, east of Palafox Street
32504 in Pensacola, northeast Pensacola
32505 in Pensacola, inner western suburbs
32506 in Pensacola, western suburbs
32507 in Pensacola, Warrington and Perdido Key
32508 in Pensacola, Naval Air Station Pensacola
32509 in Pensacola, NOLF Saufley Field
32511 in Pensacola, Corry Station Naval Technical Training Center
32512 in Pensacola, Naval Hospital Pensacola
32513 in Pensacola
32514 in Pensacola, northern suburbs including Ferry Pass
32516 in Pensacola
32520 in Pensacola, used by Gulf Power
32521 in Pensacola, used by the City of Pensacola
32522 in Pensacola
32523 in Pensacola
32524 in Pensacola
32526 in Pensacola, northwestern suburbs including Bellview and Beulah
32533 in Cantonment
32534 in Ensley
32559 in Pensacola
32560 in Gonzalez
32568 in McDavid, Walnut Hill
32577 in Molino
32591 in Pensacola

Santa Rosa County
32530 in Bagdad
32561 in Gulf Breeze
32562 in Gulf Breeze
32563 in Gulf Breeze
32564 in Holt, serves parts of Santa Rosa and Okaloosa counties
32565 in Jay
32566 in Navarre
32570 in Milton
32571 in Pace
32572 in Milton
32583 in Milton

Culture

Pensacola shares some aspects of European colonial culture seen in other Gulf cities like New Orleans, Galveston, TX, Biloxi, MS, and Mobile, AL. Initially settled by the Spanish, Pensacola celebrates this history with the annual Festival of the Five Flags. Pensacola also celebrates Mardi Gras each year, though, the city’s festivities focus on the weekend before Mardi Gras. 

Pensacola has a vibrant food culture that blends Southern cuisine with the bountiful seafood offerings of its coastal geographic setting. Among its popular dishes are fried mullet, shrimp and grits, fried grouper sandwiches, and grilled red snapper. Pensacola is world renowned for its seafood markets, none better know than Joe Patti’s Seafood, the largest seafood market in America. Pensacola’s proximity to fertile agricultural lands allows for seasonal harvests of peanuts, butter beans, silver corn, tomatoes, strawberries, and blue berries.

Performing Arts 

 Pensacola Symphony Orchestra
 Pensacola Saenger Theatre
 Pensacola Opera
 Pensacola Little Theatre
 Choral Society of Pensacola
 Ballet Pensacola
 Pensacola Children's Chorus

Museums
National Museum of Naval Aviation 
Parts of the Gulf Islands National Seashore:
Fort Barrancas 
Fort Pickens 
Pensacola Museum of Art
Historic Pensacola's Museum of Industry
Historic Pensacola's Museum of Commerce
Pensacola MESS Hall
Milton Historical Society

Sports

Pensacola Blue Wahoos, Double-A baseball
Pensacola Ice Flyers, ice hockey
Pensacola FC, Soccer
West Florida Argos, various sports

See also

 Pensacola
 Navarre, Florida
 Milton, Florida

References

 
Escambia County, Florida
Santa Rosa County, Florida